Shaheshi railway station (literally "Shahe City railway station") is a station on Beijing–Guangzhou railway in Shahe, Xingtai, Hebei.

History
The station was opened in 1912.

References

Railway stations in Hebei
Stations on the Beijing–Guangzhou Railway
Railway stations in China opened in 1912